Men's 50 metre rifle prone at the 2000 Summer Olympics was held on 21 September. The qualification round of 60 shots was fired between 09:30 and 10:45 Australian Eastern Standard Time (UTC+10), and the final round of 10 additional shots at 11:30. Jonas Edman, previously more well known as a 300 metre shooter, took a one-point lead in the qualification round, and eventually won by a 0.9-point margin.

Records
The existing world and Olympic records were as follows.

Qualification round

DNS Did not start – Q Qualified for final

Final

References

Sources

Shooting at the 2000 Summer Olympics
Men's 050m prone 2000
Men's events at the 2000 Summer Olympics